Sindre Skjøstad Lunke (born 17 April 1993) is a Norwegian former professional cyclist, who rode between 2013 and 2020 for five different teams. He was named in the startlist for the 2016 Vuelta a España and the start list for the 2017 Giro d'Italia.

Lunke retired at the end of the 2020 season, in order to study economics.

Major results

2014
 5th Overall Giro della Valle d'Aosta Mont Blanc
2015
 7th Overall Tour de l'Avenir
 8th Overall Giro della Valle d'Aosta Mont Blanc
2018
 1st  Mountains classification Arctic Race of Norway
2019
 2nd Sundvolden GP
 3rd Ringerike GP
 6th Overall Arctic Race of Norway

Grand Tour general classification results timeline

References

External links

 
 
 

1993 births
Living people
Norwegian male cyclists
Sportspeople from Trondheim